The 601 Commando Company is a special operations unit of the Argentine Army.

History

Created on 2 April 1982, it was based on the original Equipo Especial de Lucha contra la Subversión Halcón 8 created by the Argentine Army during the 1978 FIFA World Cup.

Falklands War

The commander of this unit in the Falklands War was 34-year-old, Major Mario Castagneto. The company was divided into three assault sections.

The first elements of 601 Commando Company arrived on 24 April, spending their first night in the former Royal Marine Moody Brook Barracks (that at the time served as the 10th Mechanized Infantry Brigade Headquarters) along with several regimental commanders that had earlier on attended a briefing in the building.

Fearing that British had established an Observation Post on Tussock Island, near Stanley Airfield, Major Mario Castagneto's 601 Commando Company was sent to clear the island of enemy special forces in early May, but returned empty handed and completely covered in black soot due to an earlier supporting Pucara bombing mission on 21 April with napalm.

In the first week of May, 601 Commando Company was also sent in helicopters to sweep Salvador Settlement in search of British special forces, after the local ranch-owner Robin Pittaluga had tried to relay a message from the British task force sent to recover the Falklands (it was common practise in the islands to relay radio messages). Robin and his son Saul were questioned at gunpoint and their radio confiscated with Robin taken to Port Stanley for further questioning and placed under house arrest there for the remainder of the war.

On 21 May, the Blowpipe surface-to-air missile (SAM) team of the 1st Assault Section under Lieutenant Sergio Fernández shot down a RAF Harrier GR3 piloted by Lieutenant William Glover at Port Howard that morning and damaged (severed the internal communications wiring) a RN Sea Harrier FRS1 piloted by Lieutenant Steve Thomas that afternoon with another shoulder-launched Blowpipe SAM.

On the night of 6/7 June, the 2nd Assault Section attacked British patrols near the Murrell Bridge, northwest of Stanley.

Corporal Ned Kelly from 3 PARA's B Company reports coming under mortar fire:

Private Colin Charlton from the Close-Target-Reconnaissance Patrol from D Company observed the soft peat absorbed much of the deadly fire:

According to Private Mark Hunt from D Company:

On the night of 7–8 June, the 3rd Assault Section under Captain Jorge Eduardo Jándula took up ambush positions near the abandoned British positions, but no further contact took place between 3 PARA's D Company and 601 Commando Company.

On 10 June, a 4-man patrol under Lieutenant José Martiniano Duarte from the 1st Assault Section operating on West Falkland bumped into part of 19 Mountain Troop, D Squadron, 22nd Special Air Service Regiment. The SAS observation post on Many Branch Ridge reportedly split into two pairs with Captain Hamilton and his signaller, Corporal Roy Fonseca, covering the escape of the second pair, before Hamilton was killed and Fonseca was captured.

According to Major Cedric Delves from the SAS's D Squadron:

On the night of 13–14 June, the 3rd Assault Section under Captain José Ramón Negretti was entrusted with the all round defence of Stanley House (the 10th Brigade Headquarters), a task the Argentine Army Green Berets bitterly resented, preferring action in the frontlines.

During the Battle of Wireless Ridge, command and control broke down in the 7th Infantry Regiment and the Green Berets from the 2nd Assault Section were instructed to restore order and shoot on sight British SAS Commandos believed to have infiltrated the retreating Argentine companies.

Battle of La Tablada Barracks

In late January 1989, heavily armed leftist guerrillas from the All For The Fatherland Movement (Movimiento Todos Por La Patria or MTP) captured the 3rd Mechanized Infantry Regiment Barracks in the La Tablada suburb of Buenos Aires. In the ensuing 1989 attack on La Tablada barracks, 601 Commando Company (under Falklands/Malvinas War veteran Sergio Fernandez who had risen in ranks to major) helped recover the barracks in Close quarters combat, but lost two killed, Lieutenant Ricardo Alberto Rolón and Sergeant Ramón Wladimir Orué in the process.

21st century

The company is based on Campo de Mayo, Buenos Aires Province and is under the command of the Rapid Deployment Force as part of the Special Operations Forces Group.

Unit insignia
The members of the unit wear green berets with unit badges.

Equipment

FN FAL
Steyr AUG
M4 carbine
Brügger & Thomet APC
Colt 9 mm SMG
Browning Hi-Power
Glock 17
Steyr HS .50
FN MAG
M249
AT4

See also

Rapid Deployment Force
Special Operations Forces Group
601 Air Assault Regiment
602 Commando Company
Argentine Army
Cazadores de Montaña

Notes

Sources

External links 
 Official website
 Organization and equipment
 Argentine Infantry Official website

Special forces of Argentina
Army units and formations of Argentina
Military units and formations established in 1982
Military units and formations of Argentina in the Falklands War
1982 establishments in Argentina